Garra sahilia is a species of ray-finned fish in the genus Garra from Arabia.

Subspecies are:
 Garra sahilia sahilia Krupp, 1983
 Garra sahilia gharbia Krupp, 1983

References 

Garra
Fish described in 1983